Hakmana  is a village in Sri Lanka. It is located within Central Province.

See also
List of towns in Central Province, Sri Lanka

External links

Grama Niladhari divisions of Sri Lanka
Populated places in Kandy District